Saint-Martin-du-Mont is the name of 3 communes in France:

 Saint-Martin-du-Mont, in the Ain department
 Saint-Martin-du-Mont, in the Côte-d'Or department
 Saint-Martin-du-Mont, in the Saône-et-Loire department

See also 
 Saint-Martin-des-Monts, in the Sarthe department